The following is a list of the governors and lieutenant governors of Nova Scotia. Though the present day office of the lieutenant governor in Nova Scotia came into being only upon the province's entry into Canadian Confederation in 1867, the post is a continuation from the first governorship of Nova Scotia in 1710. For much of the time, the full title of the post was Governor of Nova Scotia and Placentia (Placentia, Newfoundland).  Before the British occupation of Nova Scotia, the province was governed by French Governors of Acadia. From 1784 to 1829 Cape Breton Island was a separate colony with a vice regal post.

Governors of Nova Scotia, 1710–1786

Lieutenant governors of Cape Breton Island, 1784–1820

Lieutenant governors of Nova Scotia, 1786–1867

Lieutenant governors of Nova Scotia, 1867–present

See also
 Office-holders of Canada
 Canadian incumbents by year

External links

References

Nova Scotia
Lieutenant governors
Lieutenant governors